Nambinzo is an administrative ward in Mbozi District, Songwe Region, Tanzania. According to the 2002 census, the ward has a total population of 18,769.

References

Wards of Songwe Region